The men's sprint or "scratch race" at the 1956 Summer Olympics in Melbourne, Australia, was held from 3 to 6 December 1956. There were 18 participants representing 18 nations in competition, with one additional non-starter. Each nation was limited to one cyclist. The event was won by Michel Rousseau of France, the nation's first victory in the men's sprint since 1928 and fifth overall. Guglielmo Pesenti of Italy earned silver and Dick Ploog of Australia finished third for bronze.

Background

This was the 11th appearance of the event, which has been held at every Summer Olympics except 1904 and 1912. None of the semifinalists from 1952 returned. The favorite was Michel Rousseau of France, the reigning world champion. His main competitor (the runner-up at the last two world championships), Jorge Batiz of Argentina, did not compete in Melbourne.

Brazil, Colombia, and Vietnam each made their debut in the men's sprint. France made its 11th appearance, the only nation to have competed at every appearance of the event.

Competition format

This track cycling event consisted of numerous rounds: four main rounds and a two-round repechage. Each race involved the riders starting simultaneously and next to each other, from a standing start. Because the early part of races tend to be slow-paced and highly tactical, only the time for the last 200 metres of the one-kilometre race is typically recorded.

The trend in the Olympic sprint competition was toward expansion of a best-of-three match format (beginning in 1932 for the final, expanding in 1936 and 1948 to more rounds). The 1952 edition had bucked that trend by returning to an entirely single-race format for the first time since 1928; the 1956 event returned to it, reversing many of the format changes made four years earlier.

The first round consisted of six heats of three cyclists each (one was scheduled to have four, but a withdrawal left it with only three). The winner of each heat advanced to the quarterfinals. The Official Report says that the eight fastest losers went to the repechage, but this is a very odd advancement rule for the sprint competition in which time is generally not relevant. Cycling Magazine provides results of repechage heats more consistent with all losers going to the repechage, which would be a much more common rule in a sprint event. In either case, there were four repechage semifinals; the winner of each moved on to the repechage finals while all others were eliminated. The repechage finals were two heats of two cyclists, with the winners rejoining the round 1 victors in the quarterfinals while the losers were eliminated.

The quarterfinals began the best-of-three rounds. The eight quarterfinalists were paired into four matches; the winner of a match was the first cyclist to win two races. The four winners moved on to the semifinals while the losers were eliminated. The semifinals again were best-of-three, with the winners moving on to the final and the losers going to a bronze medal match. Both of the medal matches were best-of-three as well.

Records

The records for the sprint are 200 metre flying time trial records, kept for the qualifying round in later Games as well as for the finish of races.

Dick Ploog broke the Olympic record and matched the world record in the first race of the competition, finishing the last 200 metres in 11.4 seconds. This time was not beaten, but was matched multiple times: Michel Rousseau in the second race of quarterfinal 1, Warren Johnston in the first race of quarterfinal 4, Rousseau again in the first race of semifinal 1, Ploog in the second race of the bronze medal match, and Rousseau in both in both races of the final.

Schedule

All times are Australian Eastern Standard Time (UTC+10)

Results

Round 1

Round 1 heat 1

León Mejía is listed as third place in this heat in the Official Report (with Lê fourth), but the Official Report also has a photograph of heat 3 which shows Mejía in that heat. Cycling Magazine reported the results as below. Mejía was likely moved to heat 3 after Günther Ziegler's withdrawal.

Round 1 heat 2

Round 1 heat 3

Ziegler is listed as third place in this heat in the Official Report, but the Official Report also has a photograph of the heat which shows León Mejía. Cycling Magazine reported the results as below. Mejía was likely moved to heat 3 after Ziegler's withdrawal.

Round 1 heat 4

Round 1 heat 5

Nyman is listed as third place in the heat in the Official Report, but Cycling Magazine indicates he did not start.

Round 1 heat 6

Repechage semifinals

Repechage semifinal 1

The Official report lists only Godefroid and Shah-Rukh, but Cycling Magazine recorded Lê as third place in the first heat of the repechage.

Repechage semifinal 2

The Official Report shows only Shardelow and Mejía, but Cycling Magazine indicates that all losers of the first round went to the repechage. It also identifies the cyclists in the other three heats, leaving Nyman. If Nyman did compete in the first round (which is unclear), he would have been assigned to this repechage heat; he did not start in it, however.

Repechage semifinal 3

The Official Report lists only Argenton and Mitchell, but Cycling Magazine places Markus third in this heat.

Repechage semifinal 4

The Official Report lists only Johnston and Masanés, but Cycling Magazine places Harrison third in this heat.

Repechage finals

Repechage final 1

Johnston won by a length.

Repechage final 2

Shardelow won by inches.

Quarterfinals

Quarterfinal 1

Quarterfinal 2

Ploog had a puncture on the first race, which was restarted.

Quarterfinal 3

Quarterfinal 4

Semifinals

Semifinal 1

Semifinal 2

Ploog had a puncture on the second race, which was restarted. In the third race, Ploog stopped, thinking he had been fouled; his protest was denied.

Final

Bronze medal match

Final

Final classification

References

External links
 Official Report

Cycling at the 1956 Summer Olympics
Cycling at the Summer Olympics – Men's sprint
Track cycling at the 1956 Summer Olympics